Lost River State Park is a state park located in Hardy County, West Virginia near the community of Mathias. The park encompasses  managed by the West Virginia Division of Natural Resources.

The park features a selection of twenty-six vacation cabins. It also provides hiking trails, horses, a swimming pool, and other sports facilities that include tennis, badminton, volleyball, and archery. Lost River State Park includes the historic Lighthorse Harry Lee Cabin (c. 1800), which is listed on the National Register of Historic Places.

The park is located near the site of the 1756 Battle of the Trough, a skirmish between Virginia militia and a band of French and Indian warriors, during the French and Indian War.

See also

List of West Virginia state parks

References

External links

 

State parks of West Virginia
Protected areas of Hardy County, West Virginia
Protected areas established in 1934
National Register of Historic Places in Hardy County, West Virginia
Historic districts in Hardy County, West Virginia
Parks on the National Register of Historic Places in West Virginia
IUCN Category III